The Renault VBC-90 (Véhicule Blindé de Combat, or "Armoured Combat Vehicle") is a six-wheeled French armoured car carrying a 90mm high-velocity gun mated to a sophisticated fire control computer and ranging system. It was developed primarily for internal security or armed reconnaissance purposes. Modeled after Renault's Véhicule de l'Avant Blindé (VAB) armoured personnel carrier, the VBC-90 was engineered in concert with Saviem and Creusot-Loire. One was also built in prototype form by Argentina under license, where it was known as the Vehículos de Apoyo y Exploración. VBC-90s were available with various chassis configurations resembling both the VAB and the Berliet VXB-170.

Development History
The VBC-90 was developed by Renault and Saviem as a specialized reconnaissance and fire support variant of the Véhicule de l'Avant Blindé. It had a very wide turret ring and was manufactured specifically to carry a large-calibre gun system. At least two prototypes had been completed by 1979 and were initially designated VCS-90. The first two had boat-shaped hulls and glacis plates reminiscent of the VXB-170 and VAB, respectively. They essentially resembled six-wheeled variants of these vehicles, albeit with larger turret rings. The third had a more unique hull and a sloping glacis plate. It was this variant which was eventually accepted for production as the VBC-90.

Unlike the VAB, the VBC was not developed to meet a French Army requirement and was intended solely for export to French military clients overseas. Nevertheless, from 1981, the French government ordered 28 VBC-90s for a single squadron of the Mobile Gendarmerie, as a replacement for the ageing AMX-13 light tanks. The last one was delivered in 1984. VBCs produced by Renault for the Gendarmerie were designated VBC-90G. Another 6 were delivered to Oman between 1984 and 1985 as part of a much larger shipment of VABs for the Royal Omani Guard.

Oman has since announced it will be phasing out its VBC-90s in favor of the much more heavily armed B1 Centauro. The French gendarmerie relegated its VBCs to reserve storage in the early 2000s.

A simplified VBC-90 variant known as the Vehículos de Apoyo y Exploración (VAPE) was developed for Argentina by Renault. It was trialled alongside a much heavier model of the ERC 90 Sagaie offered by Panhard, but neither of the two were adopted by the Argentine Army.

In 2014, Lebanon was lobbying for the purchase of an undisclosed number of VBC-90s. The deal was to be partly financed with military grants from Saudi Arabia but was frozen in 2016 due to tensions between Lebanon and Saudi Arabia.

Specifications
It has a steel hull armoured to protect against small arms fire. It has a crew of three, with the driver sitting at the front of the vehicle with three bullet-proof windows provided for the driver. A GIAT TS 90 turret carries the commander and gunner, and carries an armament of a 90 mm cannon with a co-axial 7.62 mm machine gun. 20 rounds of 90 mm ammunition are carried in the turret, with a further 25 rounds in the hull.

It is powered by a six-cylinder diesel engine mounted at the rear of the hull, driving a 6x6 drive. The vehicle is not amphibious, unlike the VAB on which it was based.

Operators

Former operators 
 
 .

Potential operators

Gallery

References

Foss, Christopher F. Jane's Armour and Artillery 1987–88. London: Jane's Yearbooks, 1987. .
Foss, Christopher F. Jane's Tanks and Combat Vehicles Recognition Guide. London: HarperCollins Publishers, 2002. .

External links

 Presentation (French)

Armoured cars of France
Fire support vehicles
Internal security vehicles
Wheeled armoured fighting vehicles
Wheeled reconnaissance vehicles
Six-wheeled vehicles
Reconnaissance vehicles of the Cold War
Military vehicles introduced in the 1980s